Harold Kennedy Cassels (November 4, 1898 – January 23, 1975) was a British field hockey player who competed in the 1920 Summer Olympics. The son of missionary William Cassels, he was born in Sichuan, western China.

He was a member of the British field hockey team, which won the gold medal.

References

External links
 
Harold Cassels' profile at databaseOlympics.com
Harold Cassels' profile at Sports Reference.com

1898 births
1975 deaths
British male field hockey players
Olympic field hockey players of Great Britain
Field hockey players at the 1920 Summer Olympics
Olympic gold medallists for Great Britain
Olympic medalists in field hockey
Medalists at the 1920 Summer Olympics
People from Langzhong
Sportspeople from Sichuan